This article lists ancient Roman aqueducts in the city of Rome.

Introduction

In order to meet the massive water needs of its huge population, the city of Rome was eventually supplied with 11 aqueducts by 226 AD, which were some of the city's greatest engineering achievements. Their combined capacity was capable of supplying at least 1,127,000 m3 (nearly 300 million gallons) of water to the city each day mostly from the Aniene river and the Apennine Mountains, serving a million citizens. Detailed statistics  for the city's aqueducts were logged around 97 AD by Sextus Julius Frontinus, the Curator Aquarum (superintendent of the aqueducts) for Rome during the reign of Nerva. Less information is known about aqueducts built after Frontinus.

These estimates may not have considered water loss. Modern engineers have questioned the validity of these figures and measured Anio Novus limestone deposits to estimate the average wetted perimeter and surface roughness corresponding to only 2/3 of the flow figure given below.

Table

See also 
 Aqueduct (bridge)
 Aqueduct (water supply)
 Parco degli Acquedotti
 List of aqueducts

References

External links

 www.romanaqueducts.info
 www.maquettes-historiques.net

Aqueducts, Rome
Aqueducts
Rome Aqueducts
Aqueducts